Herbert Leigh Rice (March 10, 1876 – December 30, 1932) was an American college football head coach who was Delaware football program's second head coach. He compiled a 11–18–4 record from 1897 through 1901. During the 1899 season, he played quarterback and halfback for the professional Duquesne Country and Athletic Club of Pittsburgh. Rice was later a prominent judge in Delaware. He died of a heart attack in 1932.

Head coaching record

Notes

References

External links
 

1876 births
1932 deaths
20th-century American judges
Delaware Fightin' Blue Hens football coaches
Sportspeople from Wilmington, Delaware